Aline Dallier-Popper (12 September 1927 – 5 February 2020) was a French academic and art critic. She was a specialist in lyrical abstraction and contemporary textile art. She was a pioneer of feminist art criticism in France.

Life 
Aline Dallier was born on 12 September 1927 in Paris. In 1952, she joined Reader's Digest. She was introduced to contemporary art by Pierre Restany, whom she met in 1954 and was married from 1955 and 1960.

In 1960, she became the collaborator of Frank Popper, who would become her second husband in 1973.

She began university studies in the late 1970s, at the University of Paris-VIII, opened in the fall of 1968, following the events of May, and where Frank Popper was a teacher and director of the department of Plastic Arts. There she studied sociology, general history, aesthetics and the history of contemporary art, and discovered there the re-emergence of the French feminist movement. In particular, she attended the Women's History and Culture seminar, led by Christiane Dufrancatel, Madeleine Rebeyrioux and Béatrice Slama. She obtained a degree in sociology, then a master's degree in plastic arts, with a thesis entitled, The Incidence of Feminism on a cooperative gallery of women, the A.I.R. Gallery, New York 1968-74. She did a doctorate in aesthetics, defended her thesis in 1980, at the University of Paris-VIII, entitled: Activities and achievements of women in art. A first example: works derived from traditional textile techniques. She formed the term “New Penelopes” about the practice of women artists who take up and reappropriate textile practices in their works from a feminist perspective.

Shortly before 1968, she met the artist Tania Mouraud who was “the first to encourage her to take an interest in the question of women in art". Likewise, the chance visit to the A.I.R. Gallery in New York in 1972, led her to take an interest in the practice of contemporary women artists, and resulted in her first academic work, with a number of articles published up to the mid-1980s in journals such as Opus International, Les Cahiers du Grif and Sorcières, and in catalogs. Her first article, written following her trip to the United States, is entitled “Le Feminist Art aux U.S.A”.

She preferred the expression "women's movement in art" over the term feminist art. She was more interested in the: 
 
Indeed, from 1985, she began to write again about male artists.

From 1980 to 1992, she was a lecturer at the University of Paris-VIII. Her course focused on the history of art and women, but more generally on the history of Lyrical and Geometric Abstraction.

A corpus of her texts is collected in an anthology published in 2009 by L'Harmattan under the title Art, feminism, post-feminism: a journey of art criticism13. Her archives are held in the Archives de la critique d'art, in Châteaugiron, France.

Aline Dallier-Popper died on February 5, 2020.

Works

References 

1927 births
2020 deaths
French art historians
French women historians
Women art historians
Writers from Paris
Paris 8 University Vincennes-Saint-Denis alumni
20th-century French historians
21st-century French historians